Mediusella arenaria is a tree in the family Sarcolaenaceae. It is endemic to Madagascar.

Description
The tree's flowers typically occur in inflorescences of two flowers, each with white petals.

Distribution and habitat
Mediusella arenaria is known only from the northwestern regions of Diana, Betsiboka, Boeny, Melaky and Sofia. Only a few populations are within protected areas.

Threats
Mediusella arenaria is in decline due to wildfires and the harvesting of its wood. The preliminary status of the species is Near Threatened.

References

Sarcolaenaceae
Endemic flora of Madagascar
Trees of Madagascar
Plants described in 1915